Mengtian, officially the Mengtian laboratory cabin module, is a major module of the Tiangong space station. It is the second Laboratory Cabin Module launched, after Wentian, and the second module to extend the existing Tianhe core module of the station. It was launched into orbit from the Wenchang Spacecraft Launch Site on 31 October 2022, successfully docking with Tianhe forward port at 20:27 UTC on the same day.

On 3 November 2022, Mengtian was relocated to the larboard port at 01:32 UTC by indexing robot arm. On the same day at 07:12 UTC, the crew of Shenzhou 14 opened the hatch and entered the module for the first time.

Purpose

The Mengtian module is equipped with expanded in-orbit experiment capacity, including eight research cabins. It provides a pressurized environment for researchers to conduct science experiments in freefall or zero gravity which could not be conducted on Earth for more than a few minutes. Experiments can also be placed on the outside of the modules, for exposure to the space environment, cosmic rays, vacuum, and solar winds. It has its own airlock.

The axial port of Mengtian is fitted with rendezvous equipment and will first dock to the axial port of Tianhe. A mechanical arm known as the indexing robotic arm, similar to the Lyappa arm on the Mir space station, then moves Mengtian to a portside port of the TCM. In addition to this arm used for docking relocation, the Chinarm on Tianhe module can also be used as a backup in place of the indexing robot arm. 

Mengtian also carries a toolbox equipped with a dexterous robotic arm, installed to assist in cargo transfer and payload release, that can be used to launch microsatellites, and an augmented-reality smart glass to assist astronauts with maintenance.

Similarly to the Wentian module, electrical power is provided by two steerable solar power arrays, which use photovoltaic cells to convert sunlight into electricity. With a wingspan of over 55 m (180 ft), each array has an energy collection area of 110 m2 (1184 square ft). The energy is then stored to power the station when it passes into the Earth's shadow. Resupply ships will replenish fuel for LCM 2 for station-keeping, to counter the effects of atmospheric drag.

Aftermath
It successfully docked with the Tianhe core module nearly thirteen hours after launch.

Assembly
The Shenzhou 14 mission to the space station assists with setting up the Mengtian module in orbit.

Gallery

See also
 Wentian module
 Tianhe Core Module
 Xuntian Space Telescope

References

External links
 Chinese Space Agency website

Chinese space stations
Spacecraft launched in 2022
2022 in China